The Sherman Building, also known as Nueces Lofts, is a historic building in Corpus Christi, Texas, U.S.. Its construction was completed in 1930. It has been listed on the National Register of Historic Places since October 28, 2010.

See also

National Register of Historic Places listings in Nueces County, Texas

References

External links

National Register of Historic Places Registration Form

Buildings and structures in Corpus Christi, Texas
Residential buildings completed in 1930
National Register of Historic Places in Nueces County, Texas
1930 establishments in Texas